The Jeanneau Brin de Folie, also called the Folie Douce, is a French sailboat that was designed by Jean Marie Finot and Philippe Harlé as a cruiser and first built in 1970.

Production
The design was built by Jeanneau in France, from 1970 until 1980, with 820 boats completed. The design was originally marketed by the manufacturer as the Folie Douce (English: Tender Madness), but in 1975, halfway through the ten-year production run, the name was changed to Brin de Folie (English: Touch of Madness).

Design
The Brin de Folie is a recreational keelboat, built predominantly of fiberglass, with wood trim. It has a masthead sloop rig, with a deck-stepped mast, one set of straight spreaders and aluminum spars with stainless steel wire rigging. The hull has a raked stem; a raised counter, reverse transom; a skeg-mounted rudder controlled by a tiller and a fixed fin keel. It displaces  and carries  of cast iron ballast.

The design has sleeping accommodation for six people, with a double "V"-berth in the bow cabin, two straight settee in the main cabin and an aft cabin with a single berth on the starboard side. The galley is located on the port side just forward of the companionway ladder. The galley is equipped with a two-burner stove, an ice box and a sink. A navigation station is opposite the galley, on the starboard side. The head is located just aft of the bow cabin.

See also
List of sailing boat types

References

External links

Keelboats
1970s sailboat type designs
Sailing yachts
Sailboat type designs by Philippe Harlé
Sailboat type designs by Groupe Finot
Sailboat types built by Jeanneau